The Mixed team sprint track cycling event at the 2016 Summer Paralympics took place on the afternoon of 11 September at Rio Olympic Velodrome. 8 teams of four took part.

.

Results : Team sprint

11 September 2016, Rio.

Finals

References

Mixed team sprint